Michael Todd Caldwell (born March 28, 1971) is a former American football wide receiver in the National Football League who played for the San Francisco 49ers. He played college football for the California Golden Bears.

References

1971 births
Living people
American football wide receivers
American football tight ends
San Francisco 49ers players
California Golden Bears football players